Lyana is a 1955 Soviet comedy film directed by Boris Barnet.

Plot 
In the center of the plot is a beautiful percussionist and Komsomol Lyana, who with her friends goes to Chisinau to take part in an amateur art contest.

Starring 
 Kyunna Ignatova	
 Aleksandr Shvorin
 Muza Krepkogorskaya	
 Radner Muratov
 Leonid Gayday
 Eugeniu Ureche
 D. Lysenko
 Konstantin Konstantinov
 Nikolay Gorlov

References

External links 
 

1955 films
1950s Russian-language films
Soviet comedy films
1955 comedy films